Camporosso is a comune (municipality) in the Province of Imperia in the Italian region Liguria, located about  southwest of Genoa and about  west of Imperia.  
 
Camporosso borders the following municipalities: Dolceacqua, San Biagio della Cima, Vallecrosia, and Ventimiglia.

History 
On 21 April 1686, the representants of eight villages, Camporosso, Vallebona, Vallecrosia, San Biagio della Cima, Sasso, Soldano, Borghetto San Nicolò and Bordighera had a meeting in order to build what they called "Magnifica Comunità degli Otto Luoghi", which can be translated as: "The magnificent community of the eight villages". Their goal was to gain independence from the nearby rival city of Ventimiglia.

References

External links

 Official website
 more info about Camporosso   

Cities and towns in Liguria